Penygraigwen is a village in the community of Rhosybol, Anglesey, Wales, which is 138.9 miles (223.6 km) from Cardiff and 218.5 miles (351.6 km) from London.

References

See also 
 List of localities in Wales by population

Villages in Anglesey